Marie-Thérèse Bourgeois Chouteau (January 14, 1733 – August 14, 1814) was the matriarch of the Chouteau fur trading family which established communities throughout the Midwest.  She is considered the "Mother" of St. Louis, and was influential in its founding and development, in essence, helping lead to its becoming an important American town and the Gateway to the West.

Early life 

She was born in New Orleans on January 13, 1733.  She had a French father (Nicolas Bourgeois) and Spanish mother (Marie Joseph Tarare). Shortly after she turned six years old, her father died, leaving her mother, her two siblings, and herself.  The following year, Marie-Therèse's mother remarried to a man named Nicholas Pierre Carco.  She lived with her mother and stepfather until her marriage, and it is thought that she returned to their household when her marriage fell apart four years later.

At the age of 15, Marie-Therèse married tavern keeper and baker René Auguste Chouteau, Sr., on September 20, 1748.  This arrangement was made by her family, with everyone expecting that the marriage would be successful.  According to commonly accepted histories, René deserted her after she gave birth to René Auguste Chouteau, Jr., in 1749. Upon being deserted by René, Marie-Therèse referred to herself as a widow as it gave her more legal and social rights.  As a widow, she could own property and have custody over her children.

Relationship with Laclède 
She began a relationship with Pierre Laclède around 1755.  With him, she had four children:  Jean Pierre Chouteau in 1758, Marie Pelagie (1760), Marie Louise (1762), and Victoire (1764).

After Laclède (along with his stepson and her son with Rene, Auguste Junior)  established St. Louis, Missouri in 1764, Marie-Therese traveled with her other four children to the new, developing colony.  At first, she lived with all the other settlers at the trading post.  However, Laclède is said to have built her a house in 1767. During this time, she kept busy, owning cattle, keeping bees, and conducting business.

A few years later, the elder René Chouteau demanded that authorities return her to New Orleans.  In 1774 Louisiana Governor Luis de Unzaga ordered her to return.  However she did not and the order was ignored until the elder Chouteau died in 1776.  Though this freed her from her marriage and allowed her to marry Laclède, Marie-Therese refrained from doing so.  At this time, Laclède had fallen into a lot of debt, and though she loved him, she did not want to be legally responsible for paying off his creditors after his death, an event that happened soon after.

Legacy and Success in St. Louis 
Laclède died in 1778.  Afterwards, Marie-Therèse remained in the stone house Laclède built for her.  From then until her death, she continued to be an influential, successful figure in the St. Louis colony. 

In addition, she helped her sons with controlling the fur trade; these sons later became leaders in St. Louis government and business for the years to follow, drawing from many of her key attributes. Her daughters as well were successful in their own right; given her large fortune at this time, Marie-Therese helped them marry well by giving them large dowries.

Upon the death of Madame Chouteau on August 14, 1814, she was buried on the grounds of the Basilica of St. Louis, King of France (which is now on the grounds of the Gateway Arch National Park).  However, when bodies were dug up in 1849 to move them to Calvary Cemetery and Bellefontaine Cemetery during a cholera epidemic, her remains could not be found.

Challenges to the legend 
Virtually all contemporary histories of St. Louis attribute a founding role to her including The First Chouteaus: RIVER BARONS OF EARLY ST. LOUIS by William E Foley and C David Rice
 and Before Lewis and Clark: The Story of the Chouteaus, the French Dynasty That Ruled America's Frontier by Shirley Christian .

However, there have been challenges to the story, including challenges by her descendants.

Part of the challenge were considered efforts to show that she did not have a relationship outside of marriage.  Other challenges were based on formal records.

Records at the St. Louis Cathedral (New Orleans) indicate that all the Chouteau children were baptized there and indicated the elder Chouteau was the father.  Further records indicate that Laclède did not leave his inheritance to the Chouteaus while the elder Chouteau did.

The legend says that Laclède and Marie had a common law marriage and that Laclède signed away part of his property to them to protect them and maintain the appearance that Marie was in a proper civil law relationship with the elder Chouteau.

However, one 1790s account, published in translation, by a French officer serving the Spaniards, Nicolas de Finiels, notes no founding role for Chouteau and even goes as far as to say there was already a hamlet at the site of St. Louis even before the founding of St. Louis.  The tale of Chouteau's role in the founding of St. Louis does not appear in the historical introduction of the first St. Louis city directory in 1820, and his name was not mentioned at all at the first celebration of the town's past in 1847.  A New Orleans militia census conducted after Laclede had departed New Orleans  shows him still at home with his mother and brothers.

The earliest St. Louis historian, Wilson Primm, dismissed the story. Auguste's role in the founding is based on his own testimony in a land dispute in the 1820s, and on an unsigned manuscript "Journal" attributed to him, announced found by his sole surviving son, Gabriel, in 1857.

References 

 

People of Louisiana (New France)
People from New Orleans
People from St. Louis
1733 births
1814 deaths
18th-century American businesspeople
18th-century American businesswomen